Issa Mohammad Yaqoub Al-Turk (born 4 January 1960) is a Jordanian football coach and former player.

As a player, Al-Turk played as a midfielder for Al-Ahli (Amman) until his retirement. As a manager he has coached multiple clubs in Jordan.

References

External links 
 

Living people

Jordan international footballers

Association football midfielders

Sportspeople from Amman

1960 births
Jordanian footballers
Jordanian football managers
Al-Wehdat SC managers
Al-Ahli SC (Amman) players
Al-Ramtha SC managers
Women's national association football team managers